Simpson Peak may refer to:

 Simpson Peak (Canada) in British Columbia, Canada
 Simpson Peak (Antarctica) in Antarctica